Huanuara District is one of six districts of the Candarave Province in the Tacna Region in Peru.

References